Camille Burt (born May 29, 2000) is a Canadian curler from St. John's, Newfoundland and Labrador. She currently plays lead on Team Stacie Curtis.

Career
Burt made her first appearance at the national level as lead for Mackenzie Glynn. The team, including third Katie Follett and second Sarah Chaytor, represented Newfoundland and Labrador at back-to-back Canadian U18 Curling Championships in 2017 and 2018. In 2017, the team went 1–4 in the round robin and finished the event tenth place with a 3–5 record. The following year, they finished 2–4 through round robin play, not advancing to the playoffs.

Team Glynn also found success at the junior level, winning back-to-back titles in 2018 and 2019. At the 2018 Canadian Junior Curling Championships, the team went 5–1 through the round robin, finishing first in their pool. They then lost all four of their games in the championship pool for a sixth-place finish. They could not replicate their success at the 2019 Canadian Junior Curling Championships, finishing 2–4 through the round robin. They were, however, able to win all three of their cross-over games to finish top of the seeding pool with a 5–4 record.

While still in juniors, Team Glynn competed in the Newfoundland and Labrador Scotties Tournament of Hearts. In 2018, the team had a strong showing at the provincial championship, qualifying for the playoffs with a 4–2 record. They were then defeated by eventual champion Stacie Curtis 7–0 in the semifinal. In 2019, they finished in last place with a 1–4 record.

Out of juniors, Burt continued to play with Glynn. She moved to third and the team brought on Sarah Cassell and Michelle Taylor as their new second and lead respectively. The team was invited to compete in the 2019 Tour Challenge Tier 2 Grand Slam of Curling event where they finished with a winless 0–4 record. At the 2020 Newfoundland and Labrador Scotties Tournament of Hearts, they missed the playoffs with a 1–4 record.

The new Team Glynn disbanded after just one season, with Burt and Glynn forming a new team with Erica Curtis and Julie Devereaux. Curtis skipped the team, with Glynn playing third, Devereaux at second and Burt at lead. Due to the COVID-19 pandemic, the team only played in one event together, the Bally Haly Cash Spiel, where they finished with a 2–3 record. Team Curtis was unable to compete in the 2021 Newfoundland and Labrador Scotties Tournament of Hearts as they could not commit to the quarantine process in order to compete at the national championship. The following season, they reached the final of both tour events they played in. At the Rick Rowsell Classic, they were defeated by Mackenzie Mitchell in the final and at the Bally Haly Cash Spiel, they lost to Heather Strong. The 2022 provincial championship was cancelled due to the pandemic. As the highest ranked team on the CTRS standings, Team Sarah Hill were appointed to represent Newfoundland and Labrador at the 2022 Scotties Tournament of Hearts in Thunder Bay, Ontario.

Personal life
Burt is currently a respiratory therapy student at College of the North Atlantic.

Teams

References

External links

2000 births
Canadian women curlers
Living people
Curlers from Newfoundland and Labrador
21st-century Canadian women
Sportspeople from St. John's, Newfoundland and Labrador